Stadionul Șoimii is a multi-use stadium in Lipova, Romania. It is used mostly for football matches and is the home ground of Șoimii Lipova. The stadium was opened on 16 September 2022, with a third division match between Șoimii Lipova and Avântul Periam, score 5–0, thus officially replacing the old stadium, which was demolished in 2016. The new stadium has a covered main stand with a capacity of 1,520 seats and modern facilities which cost €1.2 million.

References

Football venues in Romania
Buildings and structures in Arad County